Lyman Ray Patterson (18 February 1929 – 5 November 2003) was an American law professor and an influential copyright scholar and historian.

Biography
Patterson was born in Macon, Georgia. He graduated from Mercer University, and obtained a master's degree in English from Northwestern University. After teaching English at Middle Georgia College, he joined the Army where he studied Russian at the Army Language School.  During the Korean War he served as a translator of Russian radio broadcasts.  Following the Army he attended law school at Mercer University.  After practicing law for two years with the firm of Matthews, Maddox, Walton and Smith in Rome, Georgia he returned to the Mercer Law School to teach.

During Patterson's tenure at Mercer he attended Harvard Law School and wrote his S.J.D. dissertation on the history of copyright law.  He received the S.J.D. degree from Harvard in 1966.  The dissertation became the foundation for his influential book Copyright in Historical Perspective, published in 1968 and still in print as of 2007.

Patterson joined the faculty at Vanderbilt University Law School in 1963, and served as an assistant United States Attorney while teaching at Vanderbilt. In 1973 Patterson joined the faculty at the Emory University School of Law and was that school's Dean. In 1987, he joined the University of Georgia (UGA) School of Law faculty and remained there until his death in 2003.  During his career he was a visiting professor at Georgia State University Law School, Duke University School of Law, and the University of Texas School of Law.

The ALA L. Ray Patterson Copyright Award was established in his honor. The first three winners were Kenneth Crews (2005); Prue Adler (2006); and Peter Jaszi (2007).

Ray Patterson died at age 74. He is succeeded by his wife, Laura Patterson and two daughters Adelyn Hilado and Ida Patterson. He also left behind four grandchildren who consider him an inspiration to this day. He constantly stressed the importance of an education to which all four grand children took to heart. His oldest grandson, Thomas Ray Hilado, also attended Mercer University in his grandfather's footsteps. His oldest granddaughter, Laura Carol Hilado attends Emory University; where Patterson served as the Dean of the Emory University School of Law.

Bibliography
 Copyright in Historical Perspective (Nashville: Vanderbilt University Press, 1968)
 The Nature of Copyright: A Law of Users' Rights (Athens: University of Georgia Press, 1991) (with Stanley W. Lindberg)

Notes

Further reading 
 Symposium in Honor of Professor L. Ray Patterson, Journal of Intellectual Property Law, v.10, n.2 (Spring 2003).

1929 births
2003 deaths
Copyright scholars
Northwestern University alumni
Harvard Law School alumni
Vanderbilt University faculty
Emory University faculty
University of Georgia faculty
Mercer University alumni
Duke University School of Law faculty
Defense Language Institute alumni